Daniel James Irving (born April 16, 1969), better known as Dan Druff, is a bass guitarist, guitar technician, and vocalist who has worked with artists including Queens of the Stone Age, Slayer, Butt Trumpet, The Distillers, Monster Magnet and Sum 41. To date he has worked on over 50 studio records. He has been on tour with Guns N' Roses on the Chinese Democracy Tour.

Music career

Druff, who was born in New Haven, Connecticut, formed the St. Louis rock band Shagnaps in 1991. The band had much success on the local St. Louis scene.  The band featured guitarist/singer Dan Druff, bassist/singer Otis London and drummer Tony Mack. The Shagnaps broke up in 1995 and played reunion shows in 1996 and 1998.

Dan had a brief stint with the Chrysalis/EMI punk band Butt Trumpet in 1995. He abruptly quit the band onstage at a New York City concert. Dan appears in Butt Trumpet's video "I'm Ugly and I Don't Know Why."

Dan Druff started working with QOTSA on their 2000 "Rated R" album. In early 2005, Queens bassist Nick Oliveri left due to personal differences with Queen's frontman Josh Homme, and replaced Druff. Dan appears in QOTSA "Little Sister" and "Long Slow Goodbye" videos.

Notable credits
Queens of the Stone Age - Over the Years and Through the Woods (performer)
From Satellite - When All Is Said and Done (vocals, musician)
Coheed and Cambria - Year of the Black Rainbow (guitar tech)

References

External links
Dan Druff on Myspace

QOTSA official website

1969 births
Living people
American rock bass guitarists
Musicians from New Haven, Connecticut
21st-century American musicians
American punk rock bass guitarists
Guitarists from Connecticut
American male bass guitarists
20th-century American bass guitarists
20th-century American male musicians
21st-century American male musicians